The 1997 Aloha Bowl was a college football bowl game played December 25, 1997, in Honolulu, Hawaii.  It was part of the 1997 NCAA Division I-A football season. It featured the Washington Huskies of the Pac-10 and the Michigan State Spartans of the Big Ten. It was a matchup of top 25 teams.
 
Washington got off to a strong start quickly, capitalizing on a 33-yard touchdown run from running back Rashaan Shehee to take a 7–0 lead with just 1 minute elapsed. Shehee would finish the game with 195 rushing yards and two touchdowns. Just 5 minutes later, Washington quarterback Brock Huard threw a 15-yard touchdown pass to Fred Coleman as the Huskies built a 14–0 lead.

Michigan State finally broke onto the scoreboard after Todd Schultz threw a 12-yard touchdown pass to Gari Scott, and Michigan State trailed 14-7 after the 1st quarter. 44 seconds into the second quarter, Washington struck again, with another touchdown pass from Huard to Coleman gave the Huskies a 21–7 lead.

A 41-yard field goal from Nick Lentz increased Washington's lead to 24–7. With 2 minutes left in the 1st half, Michigan State's Paul Edinger kicked a 43-yard field goal making the score 24–10 Huskies. Michigan State would get the ball back again, but Tony Parrish returned a Michigan State interception 56 yards for a touchdown, as Washington built a 31–10 lead at halftime.

In the third, Shehee scored on a 15-yard touchdown run, his second of the game, and Washington held a commanding 38–10 lead. Michigan State answered quickly when Schultz found Gari Scott for a 28-yard touchdown pass making it 38–17. Washington put the game away, with a 64-yard touchdown run from Mike Reed giving the Huskies a 44–17 lead.

In the fourth quarter, Lester Towns returned another Michigan State interception 66 yards for a touchdown, making it 51–17. With just 2 seconds left in the game, Michigan State scored a meaningless touchdown on a 21-yard pass from Bill Burke to LaVaile Richardson. The ensuing extra point missed, and Washington won by a 51–23 final.

Statistics

References

Aloha Bowl
Michigan State Spartans football bowl games
Washington Huskies football bowl games
Aloha Bowl
December 1997 sports events in the United States
1997 in sports in Hawaii